Stefania marahuaquensis is a species of frog in the family Hemiphractidae.
It is endemic to Venezuela and known from Cerro Duida and Cerro Marahuaca, both in Amazonas State.
Its occurs on rocks along the forested margins of small streams at elevations of  asl. The range is within the Duida–Marahuaca National Park, and no major threats to this species have been identified.

References

marahuaquensis
Amphibians of Venezuela
Endemic fauna of Venezuela
Taxonomy articles created by Polbot
Amphibians described in 1961